Kalateh-ye Payeh (also Romanized as Kalāteh-ye Pāyeh; also known as Pāyeh) is a village in Golmakan Rural District, Golbajar District, Chenaran County, Razavi Khorasan Province, Iran. At the 2006 census, its population was 1,234, in 311 families.

References 

Populated places in Chenaran County